The following lists events that happened in 1922 in Iceland.

Incumbents
Monarch – Kristján X
Prime Minister – Jón Magnússon, Sigurður Eggerz

Events
8 July – Icelandic parliamentary election, 1922
1922 Úrvalsdeild

Births
26 January – Kristján Karlsson, poet (d. 2014)
19 February – Sigfús Sigurðsson, athlete (d. 1999)
3 September – Björn Th. Björnsson, writer (d. 2007)
23 September – Einar Ágústsson, politician (d. 1986).
30 September – Magnús Helgi Magnússon, politician (d. 2006).
6 October – Alexander Stefánsson, politician (d. 2008)

Full date missing
Hannes Sigfússon, poet (d. 1997)

Deaths

13 December – Hannes Hafstein, politician (b. 1861)

References

 
1920s in Iceland
Iceland
Iceland
Years of the 20th century in Iceland